The 2013 Coastal Carolina Chanticleers football team represented Coastal Carolina University in the 2013 NCAA Division I FCS football season. They were led by second-year head coach Joe Moglia and played their home games at Brooks Stadium. They were a member of the Big South Conference. They finished the season 12–3, 4–1 in Big South play to share the conference title with Liberty. Due to their win over Liberty, they received the conference's automatic bid to the FCS playoffs.  They defeated Bethune-Cookman and Montana to advance to the quarterfinals, where they lost to North Dakota State.

Schedule

Source: Schedule

Ranking movements

References

Coastal Carolina
Coastal Carolina Chanticleers football seasons
Big South Conference football champion seasons
Coastal Carolina
Coastal Carolina Chanticleers football